This is a list of singles that charted in the top ten of the Billboard Hot 100, an all-genre singles chart, in 2017.

66 songs were in the top 10 in 2017, eleven of which peaked in either 2016, 2018, or 2019.

Top-ten singles 

Key
 – indicates single's top 10 entry was also its Hot 100 debut
(#) – 2017 year-end top 10 single position and rank

2016 peaks

2018 peaks

Holiday season

Notes 
The duet version of "Perfect", by Ed Sheeran and Beyoncé, was the billing on the chart from December 23, 2017 to January 13, 2018.

The single re-entered the top ten on the week ending January 7, 2017.
The single re-entered the top ten on the week ending January 14, 2017.
The single re-entered the top ten on the week ending January 21, 2017.
The single re-entered the top ten on the week ending February 4, 2017.
The single re-entered the top ten on the week ending February 11, 2017.
The single re-entered the top ten on the week ending February 25, 2017.
The single re-entered the top ten on the week ending March 11, 2017.
The single re-entered the top ten on the week ending April 1, 2017.
The single re-entered the top ten on the week ending April 15, 2017.
The single re-entered the top ten on the week ending April 22, 2017.
The single re-entered the top ten on the week ending May 27, 2017.
The single re-entered the top ten on the week ending June 10, 2017.
The single re-entered the top ten on the week ending July 22, 2017.
The single re-entered the top ten on the week ending September 2, 2017.
The single re-entered the top ten on the week ending October 7, 2017.
The single re-entered the top ten on the week ending October 28, 2017.
The single re-entered the top ten on the week ending November 25, 2017.
The single re-entered the top ten on the week ending December 2, 2017.
The single re-entered the top ten on the week ending December 9, 2017.

See also 
 2017 in American music
 List of Billboard Hot 100 number ones of 2017
 Billboard Year-End Hot 100 singles of 2017

References

External links
Billboard.com
Billboard.biz
The Billboard Hot 100

United States Hot 100 Top Ten Singles
2017